Lee Wendel Casperson (born 1944) is an American physicist and engineer.

Casperson earned his bachelor of science degree from the Massachusetts Institute of Technology in 1966. He then pursued a master of science and doctorate at the California Institute of Technology, graduating in 1971. Casperson subsequently taught at the University of Portland. While at Portland, he was elected a fellow of the IEEE, as well as a fellow of the American Physical Society. He later joined the faculty of the University of North Carolina at Charlotte.

Selected publications

References

Living people
Fellow Members of the IEEE
California Institute of Technology alumni
20th-century American physicists
20th-century American engineers
American electrical engineers
Portland State University faculty
Massachusetts Institute of Technology alumni
Fellows of the American Physical Society
University of North Carolina at Charlotte faculty
1944 births